Yves Gaucher,  (January 3, 1934 – September 8, 2000) was an abstract painter and printmaker. He is considered a leader amongst Quebec's printmakers in the 1950s and 60s. His work has been included in the collections of public galleries such as the National Gallery of Canada in Ottawa, the Museum of Modern Art in New York City, and the Victoria and Albert Museum in London.

Early life and education
Yves Gaucher was born on January 3, 1934, in Montreal to Tancrède Gaucher, a pharmacist and optician, and Laura Élie Gaucher, as the sixth of eight children.

He attended the Collège Brébeuf in Montreal in 1948, but was expelled for drawing immoral pictures. These pictures were in fact copied from his textbooks on Ancient Greek and Egyptian art. A year after his expulsion he switched to an English-language Protestant school, Sir George Williams College and it was there that he took his first art course.

Music was very important to Gaucher. Raised in a musical home, where everyone played an instrument, Gaucher took up the trumpet at age twelve. His first full-time job was with the CBC, where he started in the mailroom. His ambition, however, was to become a radio announcer with his own jazz program. In the meantime he played gigs at night, and also organized a few jam sessions in 1955–56 at Galerie L'Actuelle, founded by Guido Molinari.

After the CBC he then went on to become an employee of the Canadian Pacific Steamship Line, working in its Montreal and Halifax offices.

After meeting Arthur Lismer, a Group of Seven artist, Gaucher decided to study art seriously. He enrolled at the École des Beaux-Arts in Montreal in 1954, but was expelled in 1956 for taking only the courses he was interested in. After his expulsion, he continued to study art on his own, while earning an income through various jobs. Gaucher then returned to the École to study printmaking with Albert Dumouchel, where he created a controversial technique of heavy embossing. When met with criticism, he described his technique as a way of challenging the traditional "taboos".

Art career

Early printmaking success
Gaucher's art career began when he set up an exhibition at the Galerie d'Échange in Montreal in 1957. He enjoyed success afterwards, and as a result became the founding president of Associations des Peintures-Gravures de Montreal in 1960. From 1960–64 Gaucher focused solely on printmaking. 

In 1962, Gaucher travelled to Europe on a grant from the Canada Council. There, in Paris, he encountered the music of Anton Webern, which became a major influence on him. In his artworks, he began to incorporate more irregular geometries as opposed to strictly geometric forms, as well as greater contrasts of colour. This, he felt, would better represent the atonality of Webern's music.

Gaucher's prints of the late 1950s and early 1960s were technically innovative and demonstrated extensive experimentation with relief and lamination, and have been described as delighting in "material physicality." He garnered national and international attention, and won prizes at major print shows in Canada, Ljubljana, Yugoslavia, and Grenchen, Switzerland.

Modernism
By 1964, however, Gaucher began to focus on painting instead of printmaking. A major influence in his early paintings was the style of artists such as Barnett Newman and Mark Rothko, who were New York Modernists. This led him to create similar works which emulated the structure of modernist art. Some of the characteristics of the artwork he produced in this period include the use of regular geometric objects and flat panels of colour on unusually large canvases. He also created art using mathematical relationships, including symmetry, patterning, and spatial relationships, which eventually led to monochromatic works.

In 1966, works by Gaucher along with those of Alex Colville and Sorel Etrog represented Canada at the Venice Biennale. From 1967 to 1969, Gaucher created a series of Grey on Grey paintings. These works, amongst his most important, were meant to be interpreted in two different ways. As individual paintings, they would be seen based on their linear movement; as a whole, they were an environment, based on colour.

Gaucher was crucial in the development of the colour band style of art, which was first created in 1970. This form of painting consists of wide stripes of uniform colours. Gaucher also extended  colour band painting to include works of  horizontal planes of contrasting colour. Gaucher's interest in mathematical art persisted, as he created works based on chaos theory  and the diagonal line.

In 1980, Gaucher received the Order of Canada, and was named a member in 1981. In this period he taught at Concordia University in Montreal, where among his pupils was Joan Rankin. However, a shoulder injury and other health problems would force him to paint on smaller surfaces, and he returned to creating collages, one of his earlier practices.

He was an associate member of the Royal Canadian Academy of Arts 

He died in Montreal on September 8, 2000.

Personal life
In 1964, he married Germaine Chaussé. They had two sons; Benoit Gaucher was born in 1968, and Denis Gaucher in 1970.

Works
An incomplete list of works by Gaucher:

Prints
Untitled (1958)
Espace linéaire No. 1 (1958)
La Tête No. 2 (1958)
Untitled (1959)
143° (1960)
Sotoba (1961)
Asagao (1961)
Naka (1962)
Lux (1962)
Sgana (1962)
Houda (1963)
Sono (1963)
En hommage à Webern (1963) (series)
Fugue Jaune (1963)
Transitions (1966) (series)
Jericho (1978)
Fente (1986)
Signal (1991)
Pauses (1993)
En pièces détachées (1996) (series)

Paintings
Conclusion 230 (1960)
Square Dances (1964) (series)
Point-contrepoint (1965)
Signals/Silences (1965) (series)
Ragas (1966) (series)
Alap (1967)
Grey on Grey (1967–69) (series)
R-69 (1970)
Champ vert (1971)
Colour bands (1971–75) (series)
Orange-jaune (1977)
Jericho: An Allusion to Barnet Newman (1978) (series)
Inversions 1 and 2 (1980)
Phase I, II, and III (1981)
New Works on Paper (1986) (series)
Dark Paintings (1986) (series)
Trinome (1996) (series)
Red, Blue, and Yellow (1998)

References

Further reading 
Nasgaard, Roald. Yves Gaucher: Life & Work. Toronto: Art Canada Institute, 2015. 

Artists from Quebec
Abstract painters
20th-century Canadian printmakers
1934 births
2000 deaths
Members of the Order of Canada
Members of the Royal Canadian Academy of Arts
Mathematical artists
Canadian contemporary artists
20th-century Canadian painters
Canadian male artists
Canadian abstract artists
20th-century Canadian male artists